Animanimals is a German flash-animated children's comedy television series. The series is created and directed by Julia Ocker, produced by Studio Film Bilder and Meta Media Entertainment, and airs on Kika and SWR in Germany. The series won a Grimme-Preis television award in 2019. It was a nominee for 2019's International Emmy Kids Award for Best Preschool series.

Premise 
The series follows a wide variety of animals, insects, and creatures, facing quirky scenarios in every episode. When something goes wrong, the animals try something new.

Broadcast 
This series is also shown on Disney Channel in Japan, ITVBe in the UK, PTS Taiwan, TVOKids in Canada, Discovery Kids in MENA, Télé-Québec and Knowledge Kids in Canada, YLE in Finland, NRK in Norway, JimJam in EMEA, and TVNZ in New Zealand.

References

2013 German television series debuts
2018 German television series endings
2013 British television series debuts
2018 British television series endings
TVO original programming
Animated television series about animals
Animated television series without speech